SS Lituania may refer to one of two ships associated with the Russian American Line:

 , the former East Asiatic Company ship Kina; renamed Lituania in 1907 when transferred to the Russian American Line
 , the former Czaritsa (sometimes spelled Tsarina) for the Russian American Line; renamed Lituania when transferred to the Baltic American Line in 1921

Ship names